Ouyang Yu (born 1955) is a contemporary Chinese-Australian author, translator and academic.

Ouyang Yu was born in the People's Republic of China, arriving in Australia in 1991 to study for a Ph. D. at La Trobe University which he completed in 1995. Since then his literary output has been prodigious. Apart from several collections of poetry and a novel he has translated authors as diverse as Christina Stead, Xavier Herbert, Germaine Greer and 
David Malouf among others. He also edits Otherland, which is a bilingual English-Chinese literary journal. In 2015 he was shortlisted for the New South Wales Premier's Literary Awards Translation Prize, while in 2021 he won the Judith Wright Calanthe Award for a Poetry Collection at the Queensland Literary Awards for Terminally Poetic. Also in 2021, he was a finalist for the Melbourne Writers Prize.

Bibliography 
Poetry
 Moon Over Melbourne and other Poems  (Papyrus Publishing, 1995) 
 Songs of the Last Chinese Poet (Wild Peony, 1997) 
 Two Hearts, Two Tongues and Rain-Coloured Eyes (University of Hawaii, 2002) 
 New and Selected Poems (Salt, 2004) 
Terminally Poetic (Ginninderra, 2020)  

Novels
The Eastern Slope Chronicle (Brandl & Schlesinger, 2002) 
The English Class (Transit Lounge, 2010)
Loose: A Wild History (Wakefield Press, 2011)
Diary of a naked Official (Transit Lounge, 2014)

Non-fiction
On the Smell of an Oily Rag: Speaking English, Thinking Chinese and Living Australian (Wakefield Press, 2008) 
Chinese in Australian Fiction, 1888–1988 (Cambria Press, 2008) 
‘You in the I’: The Chinese-Australian writer Ouyang Yu speaks to Prem Poddar, Beyond the Yellow Pale: Essays and Criticism, (Otherland Publishing, 2010)

External links
 Invading Australia: a Sequence at cordite.org.au
 Nine poems at Jacket Magazine
 Poems at Poetry International Web
 3 poems at Blackmail Press

References

1955 births
21st-century Australian novelists
Australian people of Chinese descent
Australian male novelists
Australian poets
Living people
Australian male poets
21st-century Australian male writers